The Eddie "Lockjaw" Davis Cookbook, Vol. 2 is an album by saxophonist Eddie "Lockjaw" Davis with organist Shirley Scott and flautist Jerome Richardson recorded in 1958 for the Prestige label. The album was the second of Davis' popular "Cookbook" volumes to be released.

Reception
The Allmusic review awarded the album 3 stars and stated "this set, true to its name, really cooks".

Track listing 
All compositions by Eddie "Lockjaw" Davis and Shirley Scott except as indicated
 "The Rev"- 9:00    
 "Stardust" (Hoagy Carmichael, Mitchell Parish) - 6:40    
 "Skillet" - 8:30    
 "I Surrender Dear" (Harry Barris, Gordon Clifford) - 5:25    
 "The Broilers" - 4:58    
 "Willow Weep for Me" (Ann Ronell) - 4:36 Bonus track on CD reissue

Personnel 
 Eddie "Lockjaw" Davis - tenor saxophone
 Shirley Scott - organ
 Jerome Richardson - flute (tracks 1-5)
 George Duvivier - bass
 Arthur Edgehill - drums

References 

Eddie "Lockjaw" Davis albums
1959 albums
Albums produced by Esmond Edwards
Albums recorded at Van Gelder Studio
Prestige Records albums
Shirley Scott albums